Wabara is a surname. Notable people with the surname include:

Adolphus Wabara (born 1948), Nigerian politician
Lawrence Wabara, Nigerian footballer
Reece Wabara (born 1991), English businessman and footballer